Luceafărul can refer to:

Lucifer, or alternatively, Venus, the planet, in Romanian language
Luceafărul (poem), by Mihai Eminescu
Luceafărul (opera), a 1921 opera by Nicolae Bretan, based on Eminescu's poem
Luceafărul (magazine), a literary magazine

See also
Luceafărul Theatre (disambiguation)